Cobb's Legion (also known as the Georgia Legion) was an American Civil War unit that was raised on the Confederate side from the State of Georgia by Thomas Reade Rootes Cobb during the summer of 1861. A "legion" consisted of a single integrated command, with individual components from the infantry, cavalry, and artillery. When it was originally raised, the Georgia Legion comprised seven infantry companies, four cavalry troops, and a single battery. The concept of a multiple-branch unit was fine in theory, but never was a practical application for Civil War armies and, early in the war, the individual elements were assigned to other organizations.

Infantry component
The infantry battalion was assigned to Howell Cobb's brigade in Lafayette McLaws's Division of James Longstreet's Corps of the Army of Northern Virginia. The infantry battalion surrendered at Appomattox Court House on April 9, 1865.

Organization
Staff
Colonel Thomas Reade Rootes Cobb (He formed the Legion in the late summer of 1861, and served as its colonel until he was promoted to brigadier general in the fall of 1862.) After the components were separated, the highest rank in the infantry battalion was lieutenant colonel.
Lieutenant Colonel Jefferson Mirabeau Lamar (He was named Lieutenant Colonel on January 18, 1862. He was mortally wounded at the Battle of Crampton's Gap, Maryland, on September 14, 1862, and he died the next day.)
Lieutenant Colonel Luther Glenn (He was named lieutenant colonel on September 15, 1862. He retired on January 11, 1865.)

Companies
 A Company (Lamar Infantry) was formed in Newton County, Georgia.
 B Company (Bowdon Volunteers) was formed in Carroll County, Georgia.
 C Company (Stephens Rifles) was formed in DeKalb County, Georgia.
 D Company (Mell Rifles) was formed in Clarke County, Georgia.
 E Company (Poythress Volunteers) was formed in Burke County, Georgia.
 F Company (Carroll Boys) was formed in Carroll County, Georgia.
 G Company (Panola Guards) was formed in Morgan County, Georgia.

Battles
The infantry battalion fought in the following battles:

Yorktown (April 1862)
Lee's Mill (April 16, 1862)
Seven Days Battles (June 25 – July 1, 1862)
Malvern Hill (July 1, 1862)
South Mountain (Crampton's Gap) (September 14, 1862)
Sharpsburg (September 17, 1862)
Fredericksburg (December 11–15, 1862)
Chancellorsville (May 1 – May 4, 1863)
Gettysburg (July 1 – July 3, 1863)
Chickamauga [not engaged] (September 19 – September 20, 1863)
Chattanooga (September – November 1863)
Siege of Knoxville (November–December 1863)
Fort Sanders
The Wilderness (May 5 – May 6, 1864)
Spotsylvania Court House (May 8 – May 21, 1864)
North Anna (May 23 – May 26, 1864)
Cold Harbor (June 1 – June 3, 1864)
Petersburg (June 1864 – April 1865)
Front Royal (August 16, 1864)
Cedar Creek (October 19, 1864)
Sayler's Creek (April 6, 1865)
Battle of Appomattox Court House (April 9, 1865)

Cavalry component
The cavalry battalion was expanded first to eight companies, then later to eleven companies before finally being decreased to ten companies. It was redesignated as the 9th Georgia Cavalry, but continued to be called Cobb's Legion. It surrendered at Greensboro, North Carolina, on April 26, 1865.

Organization
 Staff
 Colonel Pierce M. B. Young (He was named colonel on November 1, 1862. He was promoted to brigadier general in the fall of 1863.)
 Colonel Gilbert Jefferson Wright (He was named colonel on October 23, 1863, and led the Legion until its surrender on April 26, 1865.)
 Lieutenant Colonel William Gaston Delony (He was named major on May 23, 1862.  He was promoted to lieutenant colonel on November 2, 1862.) On September 13, 1862, he assumed command of the cavalry battalion after Lieutenant Colonel Young was wounded.  He remained second in command of the Legion until mortally wounded and captured at the Battle of Jack's Shop, Virginia, on September 22, 1863, dying on October 2, 1863, in the Stanton Hospital in Washington City as a POW.

Companies
 A Company (Richmond Hussars, A Company) was formed in Richmond County, Georgia. This company was one of the original cavalry companies.
 B Company (Fulton Dragoons, A Company) was formed in Fulton County, Georgia. This company was one of the original cavalry companies.
 C Company (Georgia Troopers, A Company) was formed in Clarke County, Georgia. Members of the company were from Clarke, Hall, Jackson, Lumpkin, and other counties. This company was one of the original cavalry companies.
 D Company (Dougherty Hussars) was formed in Dougherty County, Georgia. This company was one of the original cavalry companies.
 E Company (Roswell Troopers) was formed in Cobb County, Georgia.
 F Company (Grubb's Hussars) was formed in Burke County, Georgia.
 G Company (Fulton Dragoons, B Company) was formed in Morgan County, Georgia.
 H Company (Georgia Troopers, B Company) was formed in Clarke County, Georgia.
 I Company (Richmond Hussars, B Company) was formed in Richmond County, Georgia.
 K Company (Richmond Dragoons) was formed in Richmond County, Georgia. This company was transferred to Phillips' Legion (Georgia), Cavalry by Special Orders #161, Adjutant and Inspector's General's Office (July 11, 1864).
 L Company was formed in DeKalb County, Georgia.

Battles
The cavalry component fought in the following battles:

Yorktown Siege (4/62)
Seven Days Battles (6/25/62 – 7/1/62)
Harrison's Landing, Virginia (8/2/62 – 8/8/62)
Middletown, Maryland (9/13/62)
South Mountain, Maryland (9/14/62)
Sharpsburg (September 17, 1862)
Barbee's Crossroads, Virginia (11/5/62)
Dumfries, Virginia (12/12/62)
Fredericksburg (12/13/62)
Occoquan, Virginia (12/19/62)
Dumfries and Fairfax Station, Virginia (12/27/62 – 12/29/62)
Brandy Station (6/9/63)
Upperville(6/21/63)
Hanover (6/30/63)
Gettysburg (July 1–3, 1863)
Hunterstown (7/2/63)
Brandy Station (8/1/63)
Bristoe Campaign (10/63)
Mine Run Campaign (11/63 – 12/63)
The Wilderness (5/5/64 – 5/6/64)
Spotsylvania Court House (5/8/64 – 5/21/64)
North Anna (5/23/64 – 5/26/64)
Petersburg (6/1/64 – 4/1/65)
Cold Harbor, Virginia (6/1/64 – 6/3/64)
Williamsburg Road, Virginia (10/27/64)
Carolinas Campaign (2/65 – 4/30/65)
Bentonville (3/19/65 – 3/21/65)

Troup Artillery
The artillery battery was known as the Troup Artillery (named for former governor George M. Troup). It was from Athens, Georgia. It was commanded by Capt Henry Hull Carlton After the Legion was reorganized, the Troup Artillery was assigned to the Artillery Battalion of Longstreet's Corps. The Troup Artillery disbanded April 9, 1865.

Battles
The battles it took part in were:

Yorktown Siege (4/62)
Lee's Mill, Virginia (4/16/62)
Seven Days Battles, Virginia (6/25/62 – 7/1/62)
Malvern Hill (7/1/62)
South Mountain (9/14/62)
Sharpsburg (September 17, 1862)
Fredericksburg (12/13/62)
Chancellorsville (May 1 – May 4, 1863)
Gettysburg (July 1 – July 3, 1863)
Antietam Creek, Maryland (7/10/63)
The Wilderness (5/5/64 – 5/6/64)
Spotsylvania Court House (5/8/64 – 5/21/64)
North Anna (5/23/64 – 5/26/64)
Petersburg (6/1/64 – 4/1/65)
Cold Harbor (6/1/64 – 6/3/64)
Battle of Appomattox Court House (4/9/65)

Famous members
 A famous fictional member of Cobb's Legion was Ashley Wilkes, of Gone with the Wind, who was supposedly captured during the Battle of Spotsylvania Court House in 1864.
 Future Atlanta Chamber of Commerce President Benjamin Crane served in the legion.
 Future Mayor of Atlanta Luther Glenn served in the legion.
 Atlanta businessman, publisher, and Atlanta City Council member Zachariah A. Rice served as Major of B Company (Fulton Dragoons) in the cavalry battalion of the legion.

Literature
Dooley, Vincent Joseph and Samuel Norman Thomas Jr., eds. The Legion's Fighting Bulldog: The Civil War correspondence of William Gaston Delony, Lieutenant Colonel of Cobb's Georgia Legion Cavalry, and Rosa Delony, 1853-1863. Mercer University Press.
Turner, Nat S. 2002. A Southern Soldier's Letters Home: The Civil War Letters of Samuel Burney, Cobb's Georgia Legion, Army of Northern Virginia. Macon GA: Mercer University Press.

See also

 List of American Civil War legions
List of Civil War regiments from Georgia

External links
Cobb's Legion Website
Troup Artillery Website
Noble John Brooke Papers at Stuart A. Rose Manuscript, Archives, & Rare Book Library, Emory University

Artillery units and formations of the American Civil War
Units and formations of the Confederate States Army from Georgia (U.S. state)
Legions of the American Civil War
1861 establishments in Georgia (U.S. state)